Mirrabooka bus station is a Transperth bus station in Mirrabooka approximately 12 kilometres north of Perth, Western Australia. It has 12 stands and is served by 14 Transperth routes operated by Path Transit and Swan Transit.

History
The original Mirrabooka bus station opened in September 1979. It was upgraded in February 1983. It was refurbished in 1996, before being partially demolished and expanded in 2010, reopening on 13 December 2010.

Bus routes

Road A

Road B

Road C

Road D

References

External links

Bus stations in Perth, Western Australia
City of Stirling